Matthias Sention Jr. (also spelled Sension, and later as St. John) (November 20, 1628 – December 1728) was a founding settler of Norwalk, Connecticut.

He was the son of Matthias Sention Sr. and Mary Tinker.

He served as a selectman of Norwalk. His home-lot was number 25 near the cove.

At a town meeting on December 17, 1678, he was chosen to keep an inn at his residence for "entertayning strangers." He was paid 1 pound, 2 shillings and 6 pence for beating the drum on December 30, 1701.

He is listed on the Founders Stone bearing the names of the founding settlers of Norwalk in the East Norwalk Historical Cemetery.

References 

1628 births
1728 deaths
American Puritans
Burials in East Norwalk Historical Cemetery
Connecticut city council members
Founding settlers of Norwalk, Connecticut
Matthias
People from Windsor, Berkshire
American centenarians
Men centenarians